Abdolmohammad Ayati was an Iranian author, translator and researcher in the field of philosophy, history and Persian and Arabic literature. He was born on 5 May 1926 in Borujerd, Borujerd County, Lorestan Province, Iran and died on 11 September 2013 in Tehran, Iran. He was selected at the second Iran's Book of the Year Awards for Arabic to Persian translation of the book History of Arabic Language Literature.

Early life and education
Abdolmohammad Ayati was born on 5 May 1926 in Borujerd, Borujerd County, Lorestan Province, Iran.He completed his elementary education there. In 1941, Ayati entered high school and in his final years, became interested in the study of religious sciences and went to the NourBakhsh Seminary School where he studied Islamic sciences for several years.

In 1946, He entered the Faculty of Rational and Alterable Studies which is called Faculty of Theology and Islamic Studies today, at University of Tehran and received his BA there.

Career
After obtaining a bachelor's degree, he joined the Ministry of Education and went to Babol to teach. He has been teaching for over 30 years in Tehran and in the other cities of Iran and has served as chief editor of the Ministry of Education's monthly magazine and has taught Persian and Arabic literature at Farabi University and Damavand University.

In 1961, for the first time he wrote an article called Swamp which published in Ketabe Hafteh magazine. After that he translated and released the book Ship Wreck written by Rabindranath Tagore.

In 1969, he came to Tehran at the suggestion of the Educational Publishing Center, where he worked. He has served as chief editor of the Ministry of Education's monthly magazine for 10 years until he retired in 1980.

Before retirement, he had published the books Swamp, Ship Wreck, Golden Carriage, History of Wisdom Writing and Translating the Calendar of Countries.

During his retirement he translated Al-Abar, history written by Ibn Khaldun into six volumes and translated books such as the History of Islamic State in Andalusia into 5 volumes and the History of Arabic language literature and the History of philosophy in the Islamic world, etc.

He was a famous translator of Arabic to Persian and has published the Persian translations of the Quran, Nahj al-Balagha and Al-Sahifa al-Sajjadiyya.

Until his death, Ayati was a permanent member of the Academy of Persian Language and Literature and chairs the Scientific Council of the Encyclopedia of Literary Research there.

Death

Abdolmohammad Ayati died on 11 September 2013 in Imam Hossein Hospital, Tehran, Iran at age 87 due to cardiac arrest.

He buried at Namavaran Segment of Behesht-e Zahra, Tehran, Iran.

Many Iranian officials and authorities send condolences for his death.

Bibliography

Compilations
 Moallaght Sabe, Seven Pendants, 1966
 Tahrire Tarikhe Vassaf, Writing of the Descriptioned History, 1967
 Dastane Khosro va Shirin, The Story of Khosrow and Shirin, Poem by Nizami Ganjavi, 1974
 Shokouhe Ghasideh, The glory of the ode, 1985
 Gozideye Makhzanol Asrar: Az Panj Ganje Nezami Ganjavi, Selected of Secrets Reservoir: From Five Treasures of Nizami Ganjavi, 1988
 Gozideye Khosro va Shirin, Brief of Khosrow and Shirin, Poems by Nizami Ganjavi, 1991
 Gozideye Leili va Majnoon, Brief of Layla and Majnun, Poems by Nizami Ganjavi, 1991
 Gozideye Eskandarnameh, An excerpt from Nizami Ganjavi's Eskandarnameh, 1993
 Ganjoure Panj Ganj: Gozideh Ashare Nezami Ganjavi, Treasurer five treasure: Selection of Nizami Ganjavi poems, 1995
 Sharhe Manzoomeye Manli va Panzdah Gheteye Digar az Nima Yooshij, Description of the Manley Epopee and fifteen other pieces by Nima Yooshij, 1996
 Renda, Renda: Twenty stories from twenty contemporary Syrian writers, 1997
 Pire Neishabour, An old man from Nishapur: An excerpt from Attar's poems, 1997
 Raze Sakhreha: Majmoueye Dastan, The Secret of the Rocks: A Story Collection, 1998
 Ghesseye Barbod va 20 Ghesseye Digar az Shahnameh, The Story of Barbod and 20 Other Story from Shahnameh, 2001
 Dar Tamame Toule Shab, In All the Night Duration, explanation for four long poems of Nima Yooshij, 2004
 Safireh Sokhan, Ambassador of the Speech: A Collection of Articles by Professor Abdolmohammad Ayati on Literary Criticism, Theology and Mysticism, History and History of Islam, 2006
 Tafsiri bar Shere Shamsol Manaqeb, An Interpretation of Shams al-Manaqib's Poetry by Shams al-Shoa'ra Soroush Esfahani, Poem by Soroush Esfahani, 2008
 Baharestane Sokhan, Springiness of the Speech, 2009

Translations
 Kashtie Shekasteh, Ship Wreck, by Rabindranath Tagore, 1961
 Taghvim al-Baladaan, Calendar of Countries, by Abu'l-Fida, 1970
 Ghazalhaye Abu Nuwas, Abu Nuwas sonnets, by Abu Nuwas, 1971
 Tarikhe Falsafeh dar Jahane Eslami, History of Philosophy in the Islamic World, by Hanna Al-Fakhoury, 1976
 Amorzesh, The Epistle of Forgiveness, by Al-Ma'arri, 1978
 Tarikhe Adabiate Zabane Arabi, History of Arabic language literature, by Hanna Al-Fakhoury, 1982
 Darbareye Falsafeye Eslami: Ravesh va Tatbigh An, About Islamic Philosophy: The method and its adaptation, by Ibrahim Madkour, 1982
 Al-Abar|Al-Abar: Tarikhe Ibne Khaldoun, The Lessons: History written by Ibn Khaldun, 6 volumes, 1984–1992
 Tarikhe Dolate Eslami dar Andolos, History of Islamic State in Andalusia, by Muḥammad ʻAbd Allāh ʻInān, 5 volumes, 1987–1992
 Qurane Majid, Glorious Quran, 1992
 Tarjomeye Farsi Al-Gharat, Persian Translation of Al-Gharat, by Ibrahim Saqafi, 1992
 Hejaz dar Sadre Eslam, Hejaz in the early days of Islam: An investigation into civil and administrative affairs, by Ahmad Ali (Author)|Ahmad Ali, 1996
 Joze Siome Qurane Majid, Thirty Juz' of Quran: With Farsi translation and Quran teaching, 1996
 Nahj al-Balagha, Collection of Imam Ali sermons, letters and aphorisms, by Al-Sharif al-Radi, 1997
 Basi Ranj Bordam, I suffered a lot ...: Ferdowsi on the ups and downs, by Satem Vaqzadeh, 1998
 Mokhtasareh Tarikhod Doval, Brief History of States, by Bar Hebraeus, 1998
 Tafsire Hedayat, Interpretation of guidance, by Mohammad Taqi al-Modarresi, 1999
 Masjede Sharife Nabavi dar Toule Tarikh, Sharif Prophetic Mosque throughout history, by Abdolghader Ansari, 2000
 Shahnameye Ferdowsi, by Abul-Qâsem Ferdowsi, Arabic writing by Bondari Esfahani, 2001
 Majamal Odaba, Litterateur Glossary, by Yaqut al-Hamawi, 2002
 Havadesol JameEh: Rooydadhaye Gharne Haftome Hejri, Great events: 7th Century AH Events, by Kamalleddin Ibn Fouti, 2002
 Dadkhahi Heyvanat Nazd Padeshahe Parian az Setame Adamian, Animal lawsuit to the Fairy King of human oppression, by Brethren of Purity, 2003
 Nazmol Hoda, Organized Gifts: Ordered and prosed translation and description of Quran's Surah, by Ibrahim Sajjadi, 2004
 Sahifeye Sajjadieh, Al-Sahifa al-Sajjadiyya, by Ali ibn Husayn Zayn al-Abidin, 2005
 Fehreste Aelam Al-Abar (Al-Abar|Tarikhe Ibne Khaldoun), Announcement list of Al-Abar (History written by Ibn Khaldun), by Ibn Khaldun, 2005
 Ayzis, A Play written by Tawfiq al-Hakim, 2008
 Vaghaye Negari Khalijeh Fars: Bakhshe Tarikhe Iran, Persian Gulf Events: The History of Iran Section, by John Gordon Lorimer, 2009
 Iran dar Ketabe Nuzhat al-mushtāq fi'khtirāq al-āfāq, Iran in the book Tabula Rogeriana, by Muhammad al-Idrisi, 2009
 Shahrzad, Shahrzad, by Tawfiq al-Hakim, 2010

Awards
 Selected at the second Iran's Book of the Year Awards for Arabic to Persian translation of the book History of Arabic language Literature, 1983
 Elected at Second Period of Iranian Science and Culture Hall of Fame, 2002
 Order of Persian Politeness, (1st Order), 2011

See also
 Mohammad-Taqi Bahar
 Ali-Akbar Dehkhoda
 Badiozzaman Forouzanfar
 Houshang Moradi Kermani
 Manouchehr Sotoudeh
 Mahmoud Mar'ashi Najafi

References

External links
 Picture Report: Funeral of the Abdolmohammad Ayati
 Abdolmohammad Ayati, Noormags
 Abdolmohammad Ayati's books on goodreads
 About Abdolmohammad Ayati (in Persian)
 Abdolmohammad Ayati, WorldCat

1926 births
2013 deaths
Iranian male writers
People from Borujerd
Iranian writers
Persian-language writers
Burials at Behesht-e Zahra
Members of the Academy of Persian Language and Literature
Recipients of the Order of Persian Politeness
Iranian translators
Translators of the Quran into Persian
Iranian Science and Culture Hall of Fame recipients in Literature and Culture
Iran's Book of the Year Awards recipients
20th-century translators